Potamotrygonocotyle dromedarius is a species of monogenean parasites of stingrays that live in Brazil.

References 

Fauna of Brazil
Animals described in 2007
Monopisthocotylea